Burgruine Senftenberg is a castle in Lower Austria at the town Senftenberg, Austria.

See also
List of castles in Austria

References

This article was initially translated from the German Wikipedia.

External links

Castles in Lower Austria